Madeleine Kanstrup Dupont (born 26 May 1987 in Glostrup, Denmark) is a Danish curler from Copenhagen. She won the Frances Brodie Award in 2004.  She currently skips her own team with teammates Mathilde Halse, Denise Dupont (Madeleine's sister), and My Larsen.

Dupont has competed in three Olympic Games and 13 World Championships, winning medals at the 2007 World Women's Curling Championship (silver) and the 2009 World Women's Curling Championship (bronze). She won a gold medal at the World Junior "B" Curling Championships in 2004 and a silver medal in 2002 at the European Curling championships as an alternate for Dorthe Holm's team. She also won a bronze medal at the 2007 World Junior Curling Championships. She won two bronze medals at the European Championships, throwing last rocks for Denmark, in 2008 and 2009. 

At the Olympics, Dupont threw last rocks for her country at the 2010 Vancouver Games, where the team finished in fourth place. She skipped the Danish team at the 2018 Winter Olympics in PyeongChang to a 10th place finish, and again at the 2022 Beijing Olympics, finishing  9th.
 
On the World Curling Tour, she won the Yi Chun Ladies International event in Yichun, Heilongjiang in December 2011 and the 2021 Women's Masters Basel.

Personal life
Dupont was featured topless in a calendar to promote curling. About the picture, she stated, "If a picture of me can get more people to watch curling on TV, that's a good thing." Dupont is a client manager at TV 2 in Denmark. She is married.

Dupont is part of a curling family, her father Kim Dupont competed at two World Junior Championships, and her brother Oliver Dupont won a silver medal at the 2016 World Men's Championship, and her sister Denise Dupont has been a long-time teammate.

Grand Slam record

Former events

Teammates
2007 Aomori World Championships
2009 Gangneung World Championships
2010 Vancouver Olympic Games 
Denise Dupont, Third
Angelina Jensen, Skip
Camilla Jensen, Lead
Ane Hansen, Alternate

References

External links
 
 
 TeamDupont profile
 2010 Olympics profile

1987 births
Living people
People from Glostrup Municipality
Danish female curlers
Curlers at the 2010 Winter Olympics
Curlers at the 2018 Winter Olympics
Olympic curlers of Denmark
Sportspeople from Copenhagen
Curlers at the 2022 Winter Olympics
21st-century Danish women